There are at least 31 named mountains in Hill County, Montana.
 Bailey Peak, el. 
 Baldy Mountain, el. 
 Big John Butte, el. 
 Black Butte, el. 
 Black Butte, el. 
 Bowery Peak, el. 
 Brindle Calf Woman Butte, el. 
 Camels Back, el. 
 Cement Hill, el. 
 Eagle Rock, el. 
 Elk Peak, el. 
 Flagstaff Hill, el. 
 Gardipee Hill, el. 
 Haystack Mountain, el. 
 Indian Woman Butte, el. 
 Little Joe Peak, el. 
 Long George Peak, el. 
 Moses Mountain, el. 
 Mount Reynolds, el. 
 Number One Mountain, el. 
 Otis Mountain, el. 
 Piney Butte, el. 
 Rattlesnake Butte, el. 
 Rotary Hill, el. 
 Saddle Butte, el. 
 Saddle Butte, el. 
 Shambo Mountain, el. 
 Signal Butte, el. 
 Square Butte, el. 
 Watsons Knob, el. 
 Wellen Peak, el.

See also
 List of mountains in Montana
 List of mountain ranges in Montana

Notes

Hill